Kalamandalam Neelakantan Nambisan (1920–1985) was a trend-setter Kathakali musician who played a crucial role in remoulding the aesthetics of singing for the classical dance-drama of Kerala, south India. Nambisan imbibed a set of fresh musical ideas from his epoch-making guru Mundaya Venkitakrishna Bhagavatar(1881-1957), developed them to sound even better and handed them over to a set of disciples, most of whom gained name and fame sooner or later.

Nambisan's weighty yet part-nasal music, which marked a quantum transition of Kathakali songs from its original Sopanam base to more of the Carnatic style, had such cascading effect on Kathakali music that it has since sounded radically different by becoming more ornate, sophisticated and bhava-oriented than ever. His prominent disciples at the Kerala Kalamandalam include virtually the who is who of the Kathakali music of the Kalluvazhi style: Kalamandalam Gangadharan, Ramankutty Varrier, Madambi Subramanian Namboodiri, Tirur Nambissan Kalamandalam Sankaran Embranthiri, Kalamandalam Hyderali, Kalamandalam Haridas, Kalamandalam Subramanian, Kalamandalam P.G. Radhakrishnan, Kalanilayam Unnikrishnan and Kalamandalam Bhavadasan, Kalamandalam Gopalakrishnan.

Nambisan was born in Kothachira village of Palakkad district on 2 November 1919. After completing primary schooling, he received training in singing Ashtapadis in the Sopanam style. He had also learnt Ottamthullal from his elder brother Parameswaran Nambisan and maddalam from Vellattanhur Raman Nambisan. Later, on joining Kerala Kalamandalam as a teenager, Nambisan was initiated into Kathakali singing by veterans Samikutty Bhagavatar and Kuttan Bhagavatar. He also learnt the basics of Carnatic music from Kakkat Karanavappadu. Soon his qualities like dense voice, adherence to the pitch, emotive rendition and sense of rhythm found grooming under the tutelage of Venkitakrishna Bhagavatar. He soon mastered anchoring the music part of story plays—be them the choreographically intricate type or ones meriting melodramatic rendition. Nambisan also parallelly received bits of training in Sanskrit, Hindi and English. He also took classes from nadaswaram player Govinda Swamy.

As a teacher, he joined Kerala Kalamandalam in 1946 and retired from his alma mater as its principal. He later served as a tutor in PSV Natyasangham, Kottakkal, as well.

In 1971, he received the Kerala Sangeetha Nataka Akademi Award.

References

External links 
 Collection of kathakalipadams sung by Neelakantan Nambisan from kathakalipadam.com: A  comprehensive database for kathakali music

1920 births
1985 deaths
20th-century Indian male classical singers
Kathakali exponents
Singers from Kerala
People from Palakkad district
Recipients of the Kerala Sangeetha Nataka Akademi Award